Horseweed is a common name for several plants and may refer to:

Cichorium intybus
Conyza
Erigeron canadensis, native to North America and Central America
Lactuca canadensis, native to North America
Laennecia